Portrane or Portraine (Irish: Port Reachrann) is a small seaside settlement, three kilometres from,the small town of Donabate in Fingal, Ireland.  It lies in the Barony of Nethercross, in the historic County Dublin.

There is a carpark, but access to the beach is restricted to pedestrians. At the north end of the beach is a National Heritage Area which is visited by many migratory birds during the winter.

Built heritage 

There are several notable historic buildings in Portrane including a 19th-century martello tower. Other notable examples include;

St. Ita's Hospital 
Portrane's most prominent feature is Tower Bay, and Portrane asylum, more commonly known as St. Ita's Hospital. Built in the early 1900s, the asylum is made up of a number of Victorian red brick buildings which dominate the peninsula. Features within the main asylum building include two churches and an imposing clock tower. The building operated as a mental hospital for many years with it finally closing to inpatients in 2011 and outpatients in 2014 before being refurbished and repurposed as a modern mental health facility. Following the sale of the Central Mental Hospital in Dundrum in 2012 it was announced that it would relocate to the updated St.Ita's facility in Portrane.

In the hospital grounds is a monument to George Hampden Evans, a replica of an Irish Round Tower.

Portrane castle 
Portrane Castle (sometimes called Stella's Tower) is a 3-storey late medieval castellated tower house adjacent to St. Catherine's housing estate. Jonathan Swift's 'Stella', Esther Johnson is said to have stayed there and given the castle its unusual nickname.
The inquisition of 1541 mentions the castle as being a substantial structure with associated outbuildings including a threshing house and hemp yard while the Civil Survey of 1655 describes this site as an old castle with a thatched hall adjoining owned by the parsonage of Portrane. A later brick chimney can also be seen at the top of the tower. Samuel Lewis describes the castle as long since deserted in his Topographical Dictionary of Ireland in 1837 and notes the last occupant was Lady Acheson.

Today the castle sits in a field of privately owned tillage land.

Erosion
The coast in this area is subject to erosion, and since the 1980s,  of beach at Portrane has been lost. Many houses on the peninsula were demolished in the 1960s due to the dangers of erosion. A storm in March 2018 caused erosion of low cliffs backing the beach, and one home was destroyed. Concrete structures known as sea bees have been placed below the cliffs, but the erosion continues and further houses are threatened.

Popular culture

Music
Members of the band U2 owned a caravan in a field in Portrane where they composed some of the music and lyrics for their 1981 album, October. Lead singer Bono was baptized at Portrane beach by the Shalom religious group which all but Adam Clayton were a member of. Rock band the Delorentos are Portrane natives.

Television
Portrane has been used as a location for a number of film and television shoots. Parts of the Channel 4 television series Father Ted were filmed in Portrane, most notably Funland in the first episode "Good Luck, Father Ted" was filmed in Tower Bay. It also featured in the BBC series "Murphy's Law" starring James Nesbitt.

References

Towns and villages in Fingal
Beaches of Fingal
Civil parishes of the barony of Nethercross